Mugguru Monagallu is a 2021 Indian Telugu-language comedy thriller film directed by Abhilash Reddy. Produced by Achut Ramarao .P through Chitra Mandhir Studio, the film stars Srinivasa Reddy, Dheekshith Shetty and Vennala Ramarao in lead roles. The film was released on 6 August 2021.

Plot 
The plot centers on three characters. One is blind Vennala Ramarao as Deepak, an expert dog instructor. Another is the deaf Srinivasa Reddy as Sushanth, who works at an internet service provider company. The last is dumb Dheekshith Shetty as Chandrathreya Kishore, a librarian. The movie concerns the serial murders of politicians taking place in Hyderabad, and how these three people along with the police nab the killer.

Cast 
 Srinivasa Reddy as Sushanth, a deaf person
 Dheekshith Shetty as Chandrathreya Kishore Varma, a dumb librarian
 Vennala Ramarao as Deepak, a blind person
 Raja Ravindra as ACP Damodar
 Thummala Narsimha Reddy as Shambavi Nayakar
 Nassar
 Twisha Sharma as Anjali D., a dumb person, Kishore's love interest
 Swetha Varma as Preethi
 Gemini Suresh
 Bhadram as Murugesan
 Chetan Krishna
 Josh Ravi
 Jabardasth Sunny
 Surya as Swetha Varma's father

Production 
Filming was done in the second half of 2020. The title of the film is borrowed from K. Raghavendra Rao's 1994 Telugu film of the same name.

Soundtrack

Release and reception 
In July 2021, the release date of the film was announced as 6 August 2021. The film was premiered on Amazon Prime Video on 2 October 2021. 123Telugu gave a rating of 2.5 out of 5 and wrote that "Mugguru Mongallu is a comedy thriller that tries too hard to impress. Though Srinivasa Reddy and a few thrills impress, the film fails to create an impact and is neither a good thriller and a comedy caper."

References

External links 
 

2021 films
2020s Telugu-language films
Films set in Hyderabad, India
Films shot in Hyderabad, India
2021 crime thriller films
2021 comedy films
Indian comedy thriller films